Niclas Eliasson (born 7 December 1995) is a Swedish professional footballer who plays as a midfielder for Greek Super League club AEK Athens. He formerly represented Sweden at under-17, under-19, and under-21 level.

Career

Falkenbergs FF
Eliasson graduated from the youth academy into the senior team in 2013. He played 29 games, scoring once but assisting 13 times.

AIK
On 1 January 2014, Eliasson signed for AIK for an undisclosed fee. From 2014 to 2016, he played 31 times, scoring once.

Loan to IFK Norrköping
On 28 July 2016, Eliasson joined IFK Norrköping on loan for the season. He featured 13 times and scored once.

IFK Norrköping
After a successful loan spell, IFK Norrköping signed Eliasson on a permanent transfer for an undisclosed fee. He played 13 times, scoring three goals.

Bristol City
Eliasson signed for Bristol City in August 2017 for an undisclosed fee – reported to be around £1,800,000. He made his debut against Birmingham City and scored his first goal for the club in a League Cup win against Premier League Watford on 22 August 2017. After only making sporadic appearances in his debut season, Eliasson revealed how he worked hard over the summer to make sure that he was in the best condition possible for the next season. Eliasson scored his first league goal that season – an 89th minute winner away at Brentford. Eliasson finished the 2018–19 season with 3 goals and was the top assister at the club with 6 assists.

Nîmes
In 2020, Eliasson signed for Ligue 1 club Nîmes. During the 2020–21 season, he scored 4 goals in 30 league appearances, notably including a brace in a 2–1 away win over Marseille. However, his side were relegated in 19th place at the end of the campaign.

AEK Athens
On 27 August 2022, AEK Athens made an official offer in the excess of €2,000,000 to acquire the services of Eliasson. Two days later, Eliasson signed a five-year contract with the Greek club.

Style of play
Eliasson's main skill is undoubtedly his crossing ability. He uses this to great effect against defenders as he can successfully cross the ball in tight areas. His preferred foot is his left, however Eliasson can comfortably use his weaker foot as well. After scoring against Brentford, Eliasson revealed how he has been working on becoming more effective in front of goal. Since then, he improved greatly and his trademark goal of cutting onto his left foot and bending it to the far corner – doing this against QPR and Bolton.

Personal life 
Elisasson was born in Sweden to a Swedish father and a Brazilian mother.

Career statistics

References

External links

 
 

1995 births
Living people
People from Varberg
Swedish expatriates in England
Swedish expatriates in France
Swedish expatriates in Greece
Expatriate footballers in England
Expatriate footballers in France
Expatriate footballers in Greece
Swedish footballers
Association football midfielders
Falkenbergs FF players
AIK Fotboll players
IFK Norrköping players
Bristol City F.C. players
Nîmes Olympique players
AEK Athens F.C. players
Allsvenskan players
Superettan players
English Football League players
Ligue 1 players
Super League Greece players
Sweden youth international footballers
Sweden under-21 international footballers
Swedish people of Brazilian descent
Sportspeople from Halland County